Pakatoa Island is one of many islands in the  Hauraki Gulf of New Zealand, covering . Purchased in the early 1900s by the Salvation Army it was used as an alcohol treatment centre for women, isolated from the Army's male rehabilitation facility on Rotoroa Island.

The island was sold in 1964 and remains one of the few Hauraki Gulf Islands in private ownership. In 2014 was offered for sale for NZD$35 million (approximately US$29 million). Regarded as sensitive coastal property, purchase by a foreign owner would require approval by the Minister of Finance and Minister of Lands under New Zealand's Overseas Investment Act of 2005.

Development on the island includes a tourist resort, a landing strip and a nine-hole golf course. Actor Russell Crowe once worked at the resort in his youth.

References

Islands of the Hauraki Gulf
Private islands of New Zealand
Islands of the Auckland Region
Populated places in the Auckland Region
Populated places around the Hauraki Gulf / Tīkapa Moana